Glavinitsa may refer to:

 Glavinitsa, a town in the district of Silistra, Bulgaria;
 Glavinitsa, municipality in district Silistra, Bulgaria;
 Glavinitsa, a village in the district of Pazardzhik, Bulgaria;
 Glavinica or  'Glavinitsa' , a medieval town in the historical-geographical region of Kutmichevitsa, today's southern Albania;